Fogge may refer to:

People
 John Fogge (died 1490), English courtier
 Thomas Fogge (died 1407), English politician

 Fogge Newton (17th century), provost of Cambridge; see List of provosts of King's College, Cambridge

Places
 Foggia, Foggia, Apulia, Italy; also known as "Fogge"; a city
 Province of Foggia, Apulia, Italy; also known as "Fogge"

Other uses
 Fogge, pre-Roman structures in Minervino di Lecce, Lecce, Apulia, Italy

See also

 Fogg (disambiguation)
 Fog (disambiguation)